Andreas Asimakis Zaimis (1791 – 4 May 1840) was a Greek freedom fighter and government leader during the Greek War of Independence.

Biography
Born in Kalavryta, in the northern Peloponnesos, Zaimis was a private and later leader of armed men who fought the Ottoman Turks during the Greek Revolution.

In 1826, Zaimis was chosen as the leader of the interim Greek government.  His son, Thrasivoulos Zaimis, and grandson, Alexandros Zaimis, would also serve as Prime Ministers of Greece.

1791 births
1840 deaths
19th-century heads of state of Greece
19th-century prime ministers of Greece
Ottoman-era Greek primates
People from Kalavryta
Prime Ministers of Greece